Hollywood Forever is the 10th studio album from L.A. Guns. The album was produced by Andy Johns, and released on Cleopatra Records.  The album was released as a CD, vinyl record and digital download.

Early work, including pre-production and songwriting, on the album began in late 2011, with recording beginning in early 2012 in Los Angeles.  The album title was chosen by Phil Lewis to express the band's connection to the Los Angeles area in general and Hollywood in particular.

The album was one of the final albums to feature production work from Andy Johns, who died in the spring of 2013.

Track listing
The track listing for Hollywood Forever is as follows; the iTunes version of the album will also include unidentified bonus tracks:

Personnel
 Phil Lewis - lead vocals
 Stacey Blades – guitar
 Scott Griffin – bass guitar (except on “Venus Bomb”) and keyboards
 Steve Riley - drums

Additional personnel
Kelly Nickels - bass guitar on "Venus Bomb"

The band recorded music videos for the songs "You Better Not Love Me," "Requiem (Hollywood Forever)" and "Araña Negra."

References

L.A. Guns albums
2012 albums
Albums produced by Andy Johns